NAD-dependent malic enzyme, mitochondrial is a protein that in humans is encoded by the ME2 gene.
This gene encodes a mitochondrial NAD-dependent malic enzyme, a homotetrameric protein, that catalyzes the oxidative decarboxylation of malate to pyruvate. It had previously been weakly linked to a syndrome known as Friedreich ataxia that has since been shown to be the result of mutation in a completely different gene.

References

Further reading